This is a list of settlements in Thesprotia, Greece:

 Achladea
 Aetos
 Agia Kyriaki
 Agia Marina
 Agioi Pantes
 Agios Nikolaos
 Agios Vlasios
 Ampelia
 Ampelonas
 Anavryto
 Argyrotopos
 Asprokklisi
 Avlotopos
 Charavgi
 Choika
 Chrysavgi
 Drimitsa
 Elataria
 Eleftheri
 Faneromeni
 Faskomilia
 Filiates
 Foiniki
 Frosyni
 Gardiki, Filiates
 Gardiki, Souli
 Geroplatanos
 Giromeri
 Glyki
 Gola
 Graikochori
 Grika
 Igoumenitsa
 Kallithea, Filiates
 Kallithea, Souli
 Karioti
 Karteri
 Karvounari
 Kastri
 Katavothra
 Kato Xechoro
 Kefalochori
 Keramitsa
 Kerasochori
 Kestrini
 Kokkinia
 Kokkinolithari
 Koritiani
 Koukoulioi
 Kouremadi
 Kryoneri
 Kryovrysi
 Krystallopigi
 Kyparisso
 Ladochori
 Leptokarya
 Lia
 Lista
 Malouni
 Margariti
 Mavroudi
 Mazarakia
 Mesovouni
 Milea
 Nea Selefkeia
 Neochori
 Pagkrates
 Palaiochori
 Palaiokklisi
 Palampas
 Paramythia
 Parapotamos
 Pente Ekklisies
 Perdika
 Petousi
 Petrovitsa
 Pigadoulia
 Plaisio
 Plakoti
 Platanos
 Plataria
 Polydroso
 Prodromi
 Psaka
 Ragi
 Raveni
 Rizo
 Sagiada
 Saloniki
 Samonida
 Sevasto
 Sideri
 Skandalo
 Smertos
 Spatharaioi
 Syvota
 Trikoryfo
 Tsamantas
 Tsangari
 Vavouri
 Vrysella
 Xechoro
 Xirolofos
 Zervochori

By municipality

See also 
 List of towns and villages of Greece

 
Thesprotia